Conus ammiralis, common name the admiral cone, is a species of sea snail, a marine gastropod mollusk in the family Conidae, the cone snails and their allies.

Like all species within the genus Conus, these snails are predatory and venomous. They are capable of "stinging" humans, therefore live ones should be handled carefully or not at all.

Description
The size of the shell varies between 35 mm and 109 mm. The color is the shell is chestnut with darker revolving lines, and upper, basal and one or two approximate bands, finely reticulated with yellow on a white ground. This pattern is overlaid with large, irregularly disposed triangular white spots.

Distribution
This species occurs in the Red Sea and the Mascarenes; in the Indo-West Pacific off Fiji, Indo-China, Indo-Malaysia, the Marshall Islands, New Caledonia, the Solomon Islands, Thailand, Vanuatu and Australia (Northern Territory, Queensland, Western Australia)

References

  Linnaeus, C. (1758). Systema Naturae per regna tria naturae, secundum classes, ordines, genera, species, cum characteribus, differentiis, synonymis, locis. Editio decima, reformata. Laurentius Salvius: Holmiae. ii, 824 pp 
 Bruguière, M. 1792. Encyclopédie Méthodique ou par ordre de matières. Histoire naturelle des vers. Paris : Panckoucke Vol. 1 i–xviii, 757 pp
 Röding, P.F. 1798. Museum Boltenianum sive Catalogus cimeliorum e tribus regnis naturae quae olim collegerat Joa. Hamburg : Trappii 199 pp.
 Lamarck, J.B.P.A. de M. 1810. Suite des espèces du genre Cône. Annales du Muséum National d'Histoire Naturelle. Paris 15: 263–286, 422–442
 Habe, T. 1964. Shells of the Western Pacific in color. Osaka : Hoikusha Vol. 2 233 pp., 66 pls.
 Wilson, B.R. & Gillett, K. 1971. Australian Shells: illustrating and describing 600 species of marine gastropods found in Australian waters. Sydney : Reed Books 168 pp.
 Cernohorsky, W.O. 1978. Tropical Pacific marine shells. Sydney : Pacific Publications 352 pp., 68 pls.
 Röckel, D., Korn, W. & Kohn, A.J. 1995. Manual of the Living Conidae. Volume 1: Indo-Pacific Region. Wiesbaden : Hemmen 517 pp.
 Puillandre N., Duda T.F., Meyer C., Olivera B.M. & Bouchet P. (2015). One, four or 100 genera? A new classification of the cone snails. Journal of Molluscan Studies. 81: 1–23

External links
 The Conus Biodiversity website
 Cone Shells – Knights of the Sea

Gallery

ammiralis
Gastropods described in 1758
Taxa named by Carl Linnaeus